Smoke & Mirrors E-zine is a monthly, international, electronic magazine for professional and semi-professional magicians and mentalists. It was originally meant to serve a small group of magicians in New York City about upcoming events. It has subsequently become more international in scope.

Smoke & Mirrors is the Internet's largest monthly magic e-zine in terms of readership. It is also the Net's oldest, monthly magic e-zine. Subscription is free.

Mission statement
Smoke & Mirrors' mission is to provide an accurate and timely source of pertinent information for professional and semi-professional magicians and mentalists. Smoke & Mirrors also offers opportunities for magicians who wish to publish their articles and reviews for the benefit of the greater international magic community.

Content
Smoke & Mirrors lists all major magic performances, lectures and conventions throughout the world. The e-zine is approximately 200KB of information taking up approximately 180-200 pages if printed out. It provides reviews and articles on important magic topics and serves to remind magicians and mentalists as to holidays pertinent to the profession.

Contributing Editors
Contributing editors for the e-zine include: 
 Scott Guinn (USA)
 Jim "Kep" Keplinger (USA)
 Kyle Peron (USA)
 Tim Quinlan (USA)
 Bob Lusthaus (USA)
 Peter Marucci (Canada)
 Daniel Shutters (USA)
 Aaron Smith (USA)
 Ed Solomon (USA)
 Larry White (USA)
 Dennis Loomis (USA)
 Tony L. Lewis (USA)
 Jon Raiker (USA)

Editors Emeriti:
 Eugene Poinc (USA) (deceased)
 Mike Bornstein (USA) (deceased)

Publication
Smoke & Mirrors is published by Kismet Magic Publishing (New York City.) The e-zine in currently in its 11th year of continual publication. As of January 2009, the e-zine is published on or around the beginning of every month and is sent directly to subscribers' email accounts.

Editorship
Angelo Stagnaro is the current editor-in-chief and publisher. He has been so since its inception in 1998.

Subscribers
Current readership exceeds 4500 readers from 67 countries.

References

Magic periodicals